The Island of Missing Trees is a 2021 novel by Turkish writer Elif Shafak. Set in Cyprus and London, it follows a romantic relationship between a Greek and Turkish Cypriot.

References

External links 

 Interview with the author on NPR

2021 novels
Novels by Elif Şafak
Novels set in Cyprus
Novels set in London
Novels set in the 1970s
Novels set in the 2010s